Jocelyn Godefroi   (1880 in Kensington – 30 March 1969) was a British translator.

Educated at Haileybury College and Trinity College, Oxford, he worked for the Lord Chamberlain's Office for over four decades. He translated several works of French literature into English, notably Gabriel Chevallier's comic novel Clochemerle and Julien Green's journals. All together he translated 18 works in 27 publications in 2 languages and 537 library holdings

References

The Author's and Writer' Who's Who, 4th ed. 1960
'The Times Diary', The Times, 26 February 1972

External links

Translated Penguin Book - at  Penguin First Editions reference site of early first edition Penguin Books.

French–English translators
1880 births
1969 deaths
20th-century British translators
People educated at Haileybury and Imperial Service College
Alumni of Trinity College, Oxford